Christian Tveit (born 10 January 1992) is a Norwegian football striker who currently plays for Vindbjart FK.

Tveit hails from Farsund and began his career in Farsund IL. The club contested the Third Division between 2008 and 2010, but in 2010 Tveit joined the team Lyngdal IL, only to progress to Mandalskameratene in mid-2010. Ahead of the 2012 season he joined the best team in Southern Norway, IK Start.

IK Start won promotion to the 2013 Tippeligaen, where Tveit played 12 games. However, he decided to leave the club, and after trials with Mjøndalen IF and HJK Helsinki he signed for Nest-Sotra. He spent only half a season there as well, before moving back to Southern Norway and Arendal Fotball, coached by former Nest-Sotra player Knut Tørum. In 2017 he played for Third Division side Flekkerøy IL, before moving on to Vindbjart FK.

References

1992 births
Living people
People from Farsund
Norwegian footballers
Mandalskameratene players
IK Start players
Nest-Sotra Fotball players
Norwegian First Division players
Eliteserien players
Arendal Fotball players
Flekkerøy IL players
Vindbjart FK players
Association football forwards
Sportspeople from Agder